Cape Lyon is located in the Northwest Territories, Canada within Darnley Bay,  from Clapperton Island. The cape was named in honor of Captain George Francis Lyon, R.N. by John Franklin. The coast ridges form high cliffs. Clay-slate and limestone lie in nearly horizontal strata beneath them. The view inland terminates with the Melville Range.

References

Peninsulas of the Northwest Territories